is the founder of Promise, Japan's third-largest consumer finance company, of which he is honorary chairman.

He funded the Ryoichi Jinnai Conference Center in Fiji.

Jinnai died of heart failure on June 27, 2017.

References

External links
Forbes profile

Japanese billionaires
1926 births
2017 deaths
People from Kanagawa Prefecture
20th-century Japanese businesspeople
21st-century Japanese businesspeople